Keilim or Kelim (literally "Vessels") is the first tractate in the Order of Tohorot in the Mishnah. It contains thirty chapters, making it the longest tractate in the entire Mishnah. The Tosefta on Keilim consists of twenty-five chapters, divided into Bava Kama ("First Gate"), Bava Metzia ("Middle Gate"), and Bava Batra ("Final Gate") of Keilim. The tractate discusses the laws of ritual purity and impurity pertaining to all types of vessels.
 Chapter 1 clarifies the ranking of ritual impurities
 Chapters 2–10 discuss earthenware vessels (clay ovens, ranges, etc.)
 Chapters 11–14 discuss metal vessels
 Chapters 15–19 discuss vessels made of wood, leather, and bone
 Chapters 20–25 discuss laws of purity and impurity pertaining to all vessels
 Chapters 26–28 discuss laws pertaining to leather and clothing
 Chapter 29 discusses the seams of clothing and vessels
 Chapter 30 discusses glass vessels.

There is no Gemara for Keilim in either the Babylonian or Jerusalem Talmud.

ArtScroll Mishnah Series has published a two volume series explaining all of Mishnayot Keilim in English with many full color illustrations.

References